The Chieftain of Göinge (Swedish: Göingehövdingen) is a 1953 Swedish historical adventure film directed by Åke Ohberg and starring Edvin Adolphson, Alf Kjellin and Eva Dahlbeck. It was shot at the Sundbyberg Studios in Stockholm. The film's sets were designed by the art director Arne Åkermark. It is based on the life of the seventeenth century Danish military commander Svend Poulsen known for leading men from Danish-owned  in Scania.

Cast
 Edvin Adolphson as Svend Poulsen
 Alf Kjellin as 	Lieutenant Henrik Wrede
 Hjördis Petterson as 	Maren Juul 
 Eva Dahlbeck as Kristina Ulfstand
 Gösta Cederlund as 	Father Petrus
 Ragnar Arvedson as 	Baron Corfitz
 Ingrid Thulin as 	Anna Ryding
 Gunnar Hellström as 	Lars Paulinus
 Erik Hell as 	Red Nils
 Elof Ahrle as 	Sören Luden
 Wiktor Andersson as 	Lille Mats
 Douglas Håge as 	Truls Inn-keeper
 Isa Quensel as 	Black-Elsa
 Bengt Blomgren as 	Narrator 
 Karl Erik Flens as 	Rebel 
 Sven Holmberg as 	Mickel 
 Göran Kjellberg as Truls' second grandchild 
 Carl-Uno Larsson as 	Truls' first grandchild 
 Gunvor Pontén as 	Laundry woman at Vanås 
 Gösta Prüzelius as 	Mårten 
 Olav Riégo as 	Army doctor 
 Birger Åsander as Messenger

References

Bibliography 
 Klossner, Michael. The Europe of 1500-1815 on Film and Television: A Worldwide Filmography of Over 2550 Works, 1895 Through 2000. McFarland, 2002.
 Qvist, Per Olov & von Bagh, Peter. Guide to the Cinema of Sweden and Finland. Greenwood Publishing Group, 2000.

External links 
 

1953 films
1953 adventure films
1950s Swedish-language films
Films directed by Åke Ohberg
Swedish black-and-white films
Films based on Swedish novels
Films set in the 17th century
1950s historical adventure films
Swedish historical adventure films
1950s Swedish films